JRK Property Holdings is a Los Angeles based real estate holding and property management company. In 2014, JRK was the 15th largest apartment owner in the United States as ranked by the National Multi Housing Council.

History
The company was founded in 1991 by Jim Lippman, who currently serves as chairman and chief executive officer. JRK was created with the purchase of five multifamily properties from an RTC pool of Executive Life assets that Lippman had been managing via receivership.  Twenty years later, the company has amassed a commercial portfolio throughout the United States valued in excess of $5 billion and, in 2008, became a member of the National Multifamily Housing Council's NMHC 50 – a list of the nation's fifty largest apartment owners.

In June 2022, JRK Property Holdings served eviction notices to 38 families at their residential complex: Redbank Village of South Portland, Maine. Acquired in late 2021, JRK Property Holdings immediately increased rent fees by 22% at the 40-year old complex.  A CBS news affiliate, WGME, documented long-standing safety and health problems at Redbank Village apartments. And, WGME noted that Maine law stipulates "landlords must fix problems that are unsafe or could make you sick before they can charge more for rent."  Evicted residents were less than a month behind in the excessive $2,400 monthly rent Redbank Village now charges. WGME stated that apartments range from 535 to 825 square foot and tenants pay all utilities, lawn care and snow removal services.  The over 70 people to be evicted included some disabled and elderly.

Portfolio
The company's portfolio consists of residential, commercial and hotel properties.

Hotel properties
Through the company's hotel division, JRK Hotel Group, the company operates a number of notable hotels, including Oceana Beach Club Hotel in Santa Monica, California, the Holiday Inn Express and the Sheraton Nashville Downtown Hotel, both in Nashville, Tennessee.

Commercial properties
The company's commercial properties consist of office complexes, storage facilities and industrial parks.

Residential properties
Through the company's multifamily division, JRK Residential Group, the company operates an additional 80 residential properties, consisting of 25,000 units in 26 different states.

References

External links 
 JRK Property Holdings official website

Real estate companies of the United States
Real estate services companies
Property management companies
Companies based in Los Angeles
Privately held companies based in California
Companies based in Los Angeles County, California
1991 establishments in California
Real estate companies established in 1991
Privately held companies of the United States